High Rolls Mountain Park is the designated name for a post office in New Mexico. The post office's name refers to the following communities:
High Rolls, New Mexico
Mountain Park, New Mexico